53rd Infantry Brigade can refer to:
 53rd Brigade (Greece)
 53rd Brigade (United Kingdom)